Margarita de la Pisa Carrión (born 19 September 1975) is a Spanish politician of the political party Vox, who was elected as a Member of the European Parliament in 2019. She became an MEP on 1 February 2020 after Brexit.

Carrión was appointed to the EU Special Committee on COVID-19, in which capacity she questioned why all treatment and prevention discussion seemed to be restricted to vaccines, noting that re-vaccinating people continually would weaken their immune systems, and that effects on pregnant women were inadequately known.

References

See also 

 List of members of the European Parliament for Spain, 2019–2024

1975 births
Living people
MEPs for Spain 2019–2024
Vox (political party) MEPs
Vox (political party) politicians
21st-century Spanish women politicians
21st-century Spanish politicians
21st-century women MEPs for Spain

Complutense University of Madrid alumni